Dylan Reid (born 1 March 2005) is a Scottish professional footballer who plays for Crystal Palace, as a midfielder. He was the youngest player in St Mirren's history to make a competitive appearance.

Club career

St Mirren

Reid made his professional debut aged 16 years and six days, coming off the bench in the 88th minute of a 3–0 Scottish Premiership defeat against Rangers. He became the youngest debutant in St Mirren history. Shortly after this, Reid reportedly attracted interest from Bundesliga giants Bayern Munich who were interested in signing him for their academy and had brought him over to visit their facilities. However, Reid declined the offer and decided to stay at St Mirren. He also garnered interest earlier in his youth career from Primeira Liga side Benfica and had a trial period with them.

In March 2021, Reid signed a new contract with St Mirren lasting until summer 2023. In April 2021, it was announced that he would miss two weeks of action for St Mirren, to focus on school work. He made his 1st career start in September 2021, during a 0-0 draw with Dundee United. Following the game, St Mirren manager Jim Goodwin praised Reid but said he lacked physicality and needed to "put more weight on."

Reid did not appear in another first team game until December 2021, when he was recalled to the squad for a game against Celtic due to a COVID-19 outbreak in the squad. He played the full game, which ended in a goalless draw, in central midfield. He was then loaned to Queen's Park in February 2022.

In July 2022, Reid rejected a contract offer from Celtic after St Mirren accepted a bid of £125,000 for the player. According to St Mirren manager Stephen Robinson, he was earmarked as a development signing for Celtic B but chose to remain at the club as he "backed himself" to break into the first-team at St Mirren.

Crystal Palace
In February 2023, Reid moved to Crystal Palace for an undisclosed fee, initially joining their Academy squad.

International career
Reid was called up to the Scotland national under-17 football team in September 2021, captaining the team against Wales.

References

External links

2005 births
Living people
Scottish footballers
Association football midfielders
St Mirren F.C. players
Scottish Professional Football League players
Scotland youth international footballers
People from Kilbirnie
Queen's Park F.C. players
Crystal Palace F.C. players